Niamh McCarthy (born 4 January 1994) is an Irish Paralympic discus thrower, competing in the F41 classification, a classification for persons of reduced stature. She is the 2018 European champion in the event at her classification and, as of August 2018, the European record holder at 31.76 metres.

Career
McCarthy started competing in discus events in 2013, winning world and European medals before taking a silver at the 2016 Summer Paralympics.

McCarthy won the gold medal at the European Para Athletics Championships in Berlin, August 2018, setting a new European record of 31.76 m

In October 2021, McCarthy retired from competitive throwing after her participation in the deferred 2020 Paralympic Games.

Personal life

McCarthy has lived in England and France. is a former student of Biological and Chemical Sciences at University College Cork. She also practises sky-diving. She has lordosis and competes in F41 classification events, which for women is for those under 140 cm (4 ft 7 in) in height.

After discovering that none of the Irish press or TV channels had sent any journalists to the 2018 Para Athletics European Championships, Niamh decided to cover the Championships herself via her Instagram account.

References

External links 
 

1994 births
Living people
Paralympic silver medalists for Ireland
Sportspeople from County Cork
Medalists at the 2016 Summer Paralympics
Athletes (track and field) at the 2016 Summer Paralympics
Irish female discus throwers
Paralympic medalists in athletics (track and field)
Paralympic athletes of Ireland
Athletes (track and field) at the 2020 Summer Paralympics